Tambo is a rural town and locality in the Blackall-Tambo Region, Queensland, Australia. Cattle and tourism are the major industries of the town. A number of heritage buildings survive from the earliest days of settlement.

Geography
Tambo is in Central West Queensland, Australia, on the banks of the Barcoo River.

The Barcoo River runs through the town and sits near the Grey Range – part of the "Roof of Queensland" section of the Great Dividing Range.

The Landsborough Highway—part of the National Highway network linking Brisbane and Darwin—passes through Tambo. Tambo is also connected to Alpha and Springsure by the Dawson Development Road.

History

Indigenous
The area on which the town of Tambo now sits was home of many different Aboriginal groups including the Wadjaling, Wadjalad, Wadjabangai, and Pitjara.

19th century
The first European exploration of the district was by Sir Thomas Mitchell, popularly known as "Major Mitchell", in 1846.  For approximately the next 15 years the area was unused until selectors began taking land in 1861.

The town of Carrangarra was founded in 1863, making it the oldest town in western Queensland. Like much of the west, sheep became the mainstay of the economy. The settlement was renamed Tambo in 1868.

The name Tambo comes from an Indigenous Australian word, meaning hidden place, or "resting place, fish, shady waters, hidden waters, a secluded spot, hidden place and native yam."

A branch of the Queensland National Bank was first established in 1875.

The Courthouse was built in 1888.

Tambo State School opened on 28 February 1876.

A Bush Mission church was built from timber in 1877 for Reverend Peter Campbell, an itinerant preacher. It was designed  by JW Wilson. It was built from timber. It has been demolished.

St Mary's Catholic Church is a Roman Catholic church at 14 Star Street. It was built in 1886. In 1955, it was demolished and replaced by new church.

Tambo Presbyterian Church was opened on Sunday 24 June 1888 by Reverend J. Mably. It was built from timber and cost £750. It has been demolished.

St Michael and All Angels Anglican Church is at Arthur Street. It was built in 1939 from timber.

Our Lady of Victories War Memorial Catholic Church is a Roman Catholic church at 14 Star Street. It was designed  by F Cullen and built from timber. On 18 December 1955, it was opened and bless by Bishop Tynan.

20th century 
Tambo was the location of Qantas' first fatal accident. An Airco DH.9 crashed on 24 March 1927 with the loss of three lives after the plane stalled while landing.

21st century 
Around 7% of the population of Tambo identity as Aboriginal or Torres Strait Islander and around 6% were born outside Australia.

Tambo was cut off for eight days during the 2010-2011 Queensland floods.

Heritage listings

Tambo has a number of heritage-listed sites, including:
 Former Tambo Post Office, Arthur Street
 Former Tambo Court House, 9 Arthur Street

Economy 
The chief industries of the town and district are grazing properties for sheep and cattle. There was a sawmill (operated by N.K Collins who operated a sawmill in Augathella) which closed in 2011. The sawmill reopened March 2018.

Education 

Tambo State School is a government primary and secondary (Early Childhood-10) school for boys and girls at 20 Mitchell Street. In 2018, the school had an enrolment of 79 students with 11 teachers and 11 non-teaching staff (7 full-time equivalent).

There are no secondary schools providing schooling to Year 12 within Tambo or nearby areas; options would be distance education and boarding school.

Media 
Tambo is serviced by:

 Radio 4VL (Resonate Radio) - 96.5 FM
 Classic Hits 4LG (Resonate Radio) - 100.3 FM
 West FM (Resonate Radio) - 101.9 FM
 ABC Western Queensland - 105.9 FM
 ABC Radio National - 107.5 FM

The Australian Broadcasting Corporation transmits ABC Television and its sister channels ABC Kids/ABC TV Plus, ABC Me and ABC News to Tambo through its Blackall relay station, ABBLQ

The Seven Network and its sister stations 7Two, 7Mate and 7Flix transmit to Tambo through its regional area affiliate, ITQ

The Nine Network and its sister channels 9Gem, 9Go! and 9Rush transmit to Tambo through its regional area affiliate, Imparja Television

Network Ten and its sister channels 10 BOLD, 10 Peach and 10 Shake transmit to Tambo through its regional area affiliate, CDT

The Special Broadcasting Service and its sister channels SBS Viceland, SBS World Movies and SBS Food also transmit to Tambo

Amenities 
The heritage-listed former Courthouse in Arthur Street contains the Tambo Visitor Information Centre and the Tambo Library. 

The Tambo branch of the Queensland Country Women's Association meets at the Royal Carrangarra Hotel in Arthur Street.

Attractions 
Tambo is also famous for its Tambo Teddy Workshop, set up by three local women in 1992 to help promote the wool industry after years of drought had cause wool prices to fall. One of these teddies was given to Prince Harry and his wife Meghan (the Duke and Duchess of Sussex respectively) when they visited Australia. There have been numerous commercials advertising the teddies..
The "Tambo Heritage Trail" includes 17 buildings within the town's precinct of historical importance. They include:
 Post and Telegraph office building
 Reg Barry's Memorial
 Survey Marker
 Old Tambo Post Office (1876)
 Courthouse (1888)
 Tambo Shire Hall
 Masonic Lodge
 Old Powerhouse
 Tambo State School
 Windmill at Tambo Mill Motel
 Primary Health Care
 The Club Hotel
 General Store
 Royal Carrangarra Hotel
 Tambo Teddies Workshop
 Queensland National Bank

Governance
Until 2008, Tambo was the administrative centre of the Shire of Tambo.  In 2008, as part of the Queensland Government's amalgamation of local government areas, the Shire of Tambo and the neighbouring Shire of Blackall were both abolished and Tambo is now a part of the Blackall-Tambo Region.

Climate 
Temperatures in Tambo range from 35 °C in summer to 21 °C in winter. Minimum temperatures in winter often drop below freezing. The average annual rainfall is 535.7 mm (21.0 in), the majority of which falls between December and March.

References

Bibliography

External links

 University of Queensland: Queensland Places: Tambo
 Town map of Tambo, 1876
 Tambo Public Library

Towns in Queensland
Populated places established in 1863
1863 establishments in Australia
Blackall-Tambo Region
Localities in Queensland